Yamal-202 is a geostationary communications satellite operated by Gazprom Space Systems and built by RSC Energia. It was, along with Yamal-201 the second dual launch of the Yamal program and the second iteration of the USP Bus. It is a  satellite with 4,080 watts of power (3.4 kW at end of life) on an unpressurized bus. It has eight SPT-70 electric thrusters by OKB Fakel for station keeping. Its payload is 18 C-band transponders supplied by Space Systems/Loral.

History 
During 1997, even before the launch of their first satellites (Yamal-101 and Yamal-102), Gazprom Space Systems was planning the second generation. At that time, they planned a 24 satellites of the second generation. This extremely aggressive plan was scaled back by 2001 with a plan to launch four Yamal-200 series satellites. The first two, Yamal-201 and Yamal-202 would be launched by 2001 and the second pair, Yamal-203 and Yamal-204 by 2004. Yamal-201 and Yamal-203 would be identical and be positioned at the 90° East orbital position and Yamal-202 and Yamal-204 would also be twins and be positioned at the 49° East.

Launch 
Yamal-202 was launched, along Yamal-201, on 24 November 2003 at 06:22:00 UTC from Baikonur Site 81/23 by a Proton-K / Blok DM-2M directly to geostationary orbit. The launch and satellite deployment was successful and Yamal-202 was commissioned into service.

Mission 
As of 22 July 2016, it is still in service and at 12 years and 8 months.

In 2019, the replacement satellite for "Yamal-202", "Yamal-601" was launched. On 19 July 2019, all the networks working on the satellite "Yamal-202", have been transferred into the satellite "Yamal-601". On 16 September 2019, at the IBC-2019 convention in Amsterdam, the transfer of the Yamal-202 satellite to the orbital position 163.5° East longitude was announced to serve the Pacific region. At the end of November 2019, the movement of the Yamal-202 satellite to the orbital position 163.5° East longitude was successfully completed. After 16 years of working in 49° East position, in 2019 the satellite was transferred to a new orbital position of 163.5° East.

See also 

 Yamal-201 – Satellite that was launched together with Yamal-202
 Yamal – Communication satellite family operated by Gazprom Space Systems
 Gazprom Space Systems – Satellite communication division of the Russian oil giant Gazprom
 USP Bus – The satellite bus on which Yamal-202 is based
 RSC Energia – The designer and manufacturer of the Yamal-202 satellite

References

External links 
  Yamal-202 technical performance

Yamal-202
Satellites using the USP bus
Spacecraft launched in 2003
2003 in Russia
Spacecraft launched by Proton rockets